Laurence S. Moss (1944–2009) was an American economist who specialized in history of economic thought and economics of entrepreneurship.  He earned his PhD  in economics at Columbia University , and later earned a law degree from Suffolk University.  Moss was the leading expert on the economics of Mountifort Longfield.  His doctoral dissertation was published as Mountiford Longfield:  Irelands's First Professor of Political Economy.  He served as the editor-in-chief of the American Journal of Economics and Sociology from 1997 until the end of his life in 2009.

References

1944 births
2009 deaths
20th-century American economists